This is a list of films produced in Pakistan in 2007 (see 2007 in film) and in the Urdu language.

Top Grossing Films of 2007

The US dollar rate is adjusted according to the dollar rate in 2007.

The top 4 films released in 2007 by worldwide gross are as follows:

Urdu language

Pashto language

See also
2007 in Pakistan

References

External links
 Search Pakistani film - IMDB.com

2007
Lists of 2007 films by country or language
Films